Brewster's Millions is a 1945 American comedy film, one of many film adaptations of the 1902 novel of the same name by George Barr McCutcheon and the subsequent smash-hit play adaptation by Byron Ongley and Winchell Smith. In the novel, Brewster is a stockbroker; in this version, he is portrayed as a returning soldier.

Louis Forbes was nominated for an Academy Award for Best Music, Scoring of a Dramatic or Comedy Picture.

Plot
Montague L. Brewster, a newly discharged American soldier back from fighting in Europe during World War II, rushes home in New York City to marry his sweetheart, Peggy Gray. However, he has to postpone the wedding after he learns of a strange windfall.

His deceased uncle has left him $8 million, but he can inherit the money only if he can spend a million of it before his 30th birthday, October 13, 1944, only two months away, without keeping any assets. The lawyer explains that Brewster's uncle hoped it would make him so sick of spending that the rest of the fortune would not be wasted. The conditions include not telling anyone what he is doing. Brewster reluctantly agrees.

He sets up his own investment company, Brewster & Company, and hires his wartime buddies Hacky Smith and Noppy Harrison as vice presidents and Peggy as his private secretary. However, despite his best efforts, most of his schemes to lose money become profitable.

Worse, Peggy becomes jealous of Brewster spending a great deal of time with first, socialite Barbara Drew, then showgirl Trixie Summers, even though he is only using them to help squander the million. Smith and Harrison (thinking that Brewster has gone crazy), begin to thwart his schemes. At the same time, Peggy breaks up with Brewster, but her wise mother persuades her to go on a costly cruise with him and the cast of a failed play he financed after Smith and Harrison close it down.

During the cruise, Smith and Harrison stage a rebellion by confining Brewster to his quarters and ordering Brewster's chartered yacht turned around to return to New York. When the yacht is disabled by a leftover U-boat mine, he escapes and goes to the bridge to order the captain to radio for help. Brewster learns that getting a tow from a passing Brazilian freighter to a nearby Florida port will cost him a huge salvage fee of $450,000. He becomes jubilant, realizing that the fee, the cost of the cruise, and the losses from the failed stage play will use up his million dollars.

Several days later, as the deadline approaches, Brewster is back in New York at Peggy's house with the receipts of his spending sprees, thinking he has met his goal, only to have his friends present him with $40,012 that they have recovered from his failed ventures. Luckily, he is able to get rid of the money by paying the executor's fee, an old $10 debt, and $2 for cab fare, just before time runs out. Having secured his inheritance, Brewster then takes Peggy out, saying that they have to go downtown to the nearest justice of the peace to get married right away.  On the way out the door, he is confronted by a door-to-door salesman. The salesman tries to sell an item for two cents more than it costs in a store.  For this reason, Brewster throws him out.

Cast

 Dennis O'Keefe as Montague L. Brewster
 Helen Walker as Peggy Gray
 June Havoc as Trixie Summers
 Eddie "Rochester" Anderson as Jackson, the Grays' servant
 Gail Patrick as Barbara Drew
 Mischa Auer as Michael Michaelovich
 Nana Bryant as Mrs. Gray
 John Litel as Swearengen Jones, a lawyer
 Joe Sawyer as Hacky Smith
 Neil Hamilton as Mr. Grant
 Herbert Rudley as Nopper Harrison
 Thurston Hall as Colonel Drew, Barbara's banker father
 Chester Conklin as Stage Doorman (uncredited)
 Byron Foulger as Attorney Lyons (uncredited)

Production
Edward Small originally wanted to film another farce, Are You a Mason? and bought the rights from Paramount in 1942 intending to make a vehicle for Jack Benny. However, there was confusion over European rights so he decided to adapt Brewster's Millions instead. He bought the rights in June 1944.

Garry Moore was originally cast but was replaced after one day of filming by Auer.

Reception
Time Out London described it as "no masterpiece but really quite inventive".

The film was banned in Memphis, Tennessee, on the grounds that it was "inimical to the public welfare" because the servant character, played by African American actor  Eddie "Rochester" Anderson, had "too familiar a way about him." The Memphis Board of Motion Picture Censors complained that the picture presented "too much social equality and racial mixture" for Southern audiences, and expressed fear that the film would "encourage" racial problems.

Remakes
The Lux Radio Theater adaptation featured Jack Benny as Brewster. Eddie Anderson played Benny's butler and conscience on The Jack Benny Show.

Small remade the film as Three on a Spree (1961). In 1970, he announced he wanted to make a TV series based on the film, but nothing came of it.

Lawrence Gordon, Gene Levy, and Joel Silver remade Brewster's Millions  (1985) starring Richard Pryor and John Candy.

See also
Brewster's Millions (1914, starring Edward Abeles)
Brewster's Millions (1921, starring Roscoe "Fatty" Arbuckle)
Miss Brewster's Millions (1926, starring Bebe Daniels)
Brewster's Millions (1935, starring Jack Buchanan)
Brewster's Millions (1985, starring Richard Pryor)

References

External links
 
 
 
 

1945 films
1945 comedy films
American comedy films
American satirical films
American black-and-white films
Films about inheritances
Films based on American novels
Films directed by Allan Dwan
United Artists films
Films based on Brewster's Millions
Films produced by Edward Small
1940s business films
1940s satirical films
1940s English-language films
1940s American films